HWZ may refer to:

 HardwareZone
 Heidemarie Wieczorek-Zeul, German politician (SPD) and former federal minister
 Zurich University of Applied Sciences in Business Administration (German ), in Switzerland